Marşandiz railway station is a railway station on the Başkentray commuter rail line in Ankara, Turkey. It is located adjacent to Marşandiz Yard and services mainly railway employees who work there. In July 2016, the station was closed down ad subsequently demolished and rebuilt as part of the Başkentray rehabilitation project. Marşandiz station also replaced Motor Fabrikası station, which closed down in 2016, hence the relocation to the east. Before 2016, the station had one exit to Anadolu Boulevard, which crossed the tracks on a north-south axis. The new station will no longer have access to the Boulevard and will instead have exits to Güvercinlik Avenue and Güvercin Road.

Marşandiz station was opened in 1944 by the Turkish State Railways, along with the yard maintenance facilities.

On 13 December 2018, a fatal collision between a high-speed passenger train and a maintenance locomotive occurred at the station. Nine people were killed and more than 80 others were injured.

References

External links
Marşandiz station in Google Street View

Railway stations in Ankara Province
Railway stations opened in 1944
1944 establishments in Turkey
Etimesgut District